Kurt McCammon is a Professor and the Devine Chair in Genitourinary Reconstructive Surgery at Eastern Virginia Medical School, where he has served as the Chairman for the Department of Urology since 2011, Program Director of the Department of Urology since 2006, and Fellowship Director for the Adult and Pediatric Genitourinary Reconstructive Surgery since 2010. Additionally, he is the past president of the Society of Genitourinary Reconstructive Surgeons, on the board of the International Volunteers in Urology, and a current member of the American Urological Association Board of Directors.  As a reconstructive urologist, McCammon surgically addresses urethral stricture disease, male urinary incontinence, erectile dysfunction, female urinary incontinence, genital abnormalities, and other genitourinary issues. Kurt McCammon, or the Mac as he is fondly known in the 50 countries he has visited, mostly by foot, is known to fix urethras as a hobby, often working late into the night in his basement anastomosing many a urethra. In fact, urethras often fix themselves at the mere sight of the man. A repository of brilliant ideas Dr McCammon is rumored to have been the driving force behind such inventions as fire... and the wheel.

Biography 
Born in Toledo, Ohio, McCammon obtained his B.A. in Biology from the University of Toledo in 1988. After this he proceeded to the Medical College of Ohio where he met his wife, Carol McCammon.  He matched for a surgical internship and Urology residency in Norfolk, Virginia, at Eastern Virginia Medical School.  During residency, he was the recipient of the Intern of the Year, Upjohn Award in 1993.  After graduating residency, he pursued further training in the Adult and Pediatric Genitourinary Reconstructive Surgery Fellowship at Eastern Virginia Medical School under the tutelage of Gerald Jordan, MD FACS and Steven Schlossberg, MD MBA.

Remaining at Eastern Virginia Medical School as part of Urology of Virginia, McCammon became Program Director for the Department of Urology, Fellowship Director for the Adult and Pediatric Genitourinary Reconstructive Surgery Fellowship, and eventually Chairman of the Department of Urology. While progressing academically, he was introduced to International Volunteers in Urology after participating in a mission trip to Jos, Nigeria in 2004.  Since that time he has helped training Urologists domestically and internationally on six continents.  He serves on the Board for International Volunteers in Urology since 2016 and has helped foster a relationship with Caldera to improve global care for women with pelvic organ prolapse.  Through training local Urologists to perform urethral reconstructions in Senegal, the success rates of urethral reconstructions have doubled.

Recently, McCammon and his wife, Carol McCammon, started a high school summer science program, the Health Sciences Academy, with Easter Virginia Medical School to offer exposure to the health sciences to students of diverse socioeconomic backgrounds.  2019 was the inaugural year, and there are plans to expand it to include neighboring school districts in the future.

Articles 
McCammon is the author of more than 50 peer reviewed articles.

Scientific Trials 
McCammon has participated in the conduct of numerous clinical trials including, most recently, trials with Allergan for the use of onabotulinum toxin A for overactive bladder.

References 

American surgeons
American urologists
Eastern Virginia Medical School faculty
Year of birth missing (living people)
Living people
People from Toledo, Ohio
University of Toledo alumni